Jakob Vestergaard (born 3 January 1975) is a Danish handball coach who is the manager of the Viborg HK.

Coaching career
Vestergaard was in charge by Romanian top division side CS Oltchim Râmnicu Vâlcea for the 2012–2013 season. He later coached the Germany Women's national team from 2015 to 2016.

International honours
Champions League:
Winner: 2009, 2010

References

1975 births
Living people
Danish handball coaches
Danish expatriates in Australia
Danish expatriate sportspeople in Romania
Danish expatriate sportspeople in Germany